Tip Top Mountain is a mountain located in Pukaskwa National Park in the Canadian province of Ontario. There are no hiking trails leading up to the peak, making it difficult to climb.

External links
 Tip Top Mountain - Peakbagger.com 
 The Atlas of Canada - Toporama - Topographic Maps

References

Landforms of Algoma District
Mountains of Ontario
Mountains of Canada under 1000 metres